Mick Haley (born August 18, 1943) is an American volleyball coach. He previously served for 17 seasons as the head coach of the University of Southern California women's volleyball team. He has also coached the U.S. Women's National Team at the Olympics. Prior to this he served for 17 years as the head coach of the University of Texas women's volleyball team.

Early life

Haley was a setter at Ball State under legendary coach Don Shondell and helped the Cardinals to the 1964 and 1965 MIVA title. Haley was inducted into the Ball State Athletic Hall of Fame in 1984. He earned his bachelor's degree in education from Ball State in 1965. Haley earned a master's degree in education from Southern Illinois University in 1966.

Head coaching history

1973–1979: Kellogg CC
Haley coached at Kellogg Community College in Battle Creek, Michigan, for seven seasons (1973–79). He first served as an instructor and intramural director, then took the helm of the men's and women's varsity teams in 1973, going 251–51 overall and leading his women's team to the national junior college title in 1978 and 1979. He also coached the Kellogg men to four national crowns during that time. In his last season there, the men's team, the only jr. college in the conference, won the MIVA, beating Ohio St. in the finals 3–0.  In 1997, he was inducted into the Junior College Coaches Hall of Fame.

1980–1996: Texas
Haley was the head coach for the Texas Longhorns volleyball team. Under his tutelage, the Longhorns were the AIAW champions in 1981 and the NCAA champions in 1988. They also reached the NCAA Final Four in 1986, 1987, and 1995. The Longhorns won the Southwest Conference title every year from 1982 to 1995, before switching to the Big 12 his final year, where they finished second in those standings.

At Texas, he carried an overall record of 522–137–1, including a 150–10 conference record.

1997–2000: Olympic coaching
Haley temporarily left collegiate coaching in order to coach the women's U.S. National Team for the 2000 Sydney Olympics, where the team fell short of the Bronze Medal to finish in fourth place.

2001–2017: USC
Haley returned to collegiate coaching, but instead of returning to Texas, he took over for USC where it did not take long for the Women of Troy to reach national prominence.

Just in his second year, Haley led the top-seeded Trojans to the program's second NCAA championship – and first since 1981 – by defeating Stanford University in the final, 3–1, avenging their only loss of the season to the Cardinal. With the win, Haley became just the second head coach in NCAA history to win a national championship at two universities.

In 2003, the team went undefeated in the regular season. The Trojans reached the championship match and defeated Florida, 3–1. The 2003 squad became the first repeat NCAA champion in six years and was the first repeat champion in NCAA history to go undefeated. April Ross was the Honda Award winner, while the 2003 team comprised four All-Americans, including three on the first team.

Since 2003, the Trojans have not won a Pac-10 or NCAA championship, but have reached the final four in 2004 (including upsetting top seeded Nebraska in the regional final), in 2007, where they were one point away from defeating top-seeded Stanford in the national semifinals  and in 2010 (upsetting Stanford in the regional final).

Despite finishing the 2017 season with a 25–10 record and ranked 14th nationally, USC announced on Dec. 16, 2017 that Haley would not be returning for the 2018 season, ending his 17-year career at the school. Haley subsequently retained legal counsel to pursue an age discrimination complaint against USC. Donna Heinel, former associate athletic director in charge of women's sports, has been indicted for accepting $1.3 million in bribes to accept non athletes as athletes.  She allegedly tried to cut the slots on the roster of the women's volleyball by one in order to sell the slot and when Mick refused dismissed him at the end of the season and told him his time had come and gone (too old).  Despite the admissions scandal at USC costing Mick Haley his position, he has indicated an interest in continuing his coaching career at another school.

Head Coaching Record

Awards and honors
2003: AVCA National Coach of the Year, AVCA Pacific Region Coach of the Year, Texas Athletic Hall of Fame induction
1997: NJCAA Volleyball Coaches Association Hall of Fame
1984: Ball State University Athletic Hall of Fame

See also
List of college women's volleyball coaches with 700 wins

References

External links
Haley at USCtrojans.com

1943 births
Living people
Sportspeople from Los Angeles
American Olympic coaches
Texas Longhorns women's volleyball coaches
USC Trojans women's volleyball coaches
Volleyball coaches from Indiana
American men's volleyball players
Ball State University alumni
Southern Illinois University alumni
People from Angola, Indiana
Volleyball players from Indiana
Volleyball players from Los Angeles